Species named Mexican kingsnake include:

Lampropeltis leonis
Lampropeltis mexicana